Mahadeo Simaria is a village in Jamui district of Bihar State, India. The village is administrated by Sarpanch an elected representative of the village. 
There is a Temple to Shiva. Shiva is called Mahadeo, so the village was named Mahadeo Simaria.

The village was a part of " Gidhaur " Kingdom.

See also
List of villages in India
List of villages in Bihar

References

External links
Census India official website

Villages in Jamui district